Missolonghi or Messolonghi  is a municipality of 34,416 people (according to the 2011 census) in western Greece. The town is the capital of Aetolia-Acarnania regional unit, and the seat of the municipality of Iera Polis Messolongiou. Missolonghi is known as the site of a dramatic siege during the Greek War of Independence, and of the death of poet Lord Byron.

Geography
The town is located between the Achelous and the Evinos rivers and has a port on the Gulf of Patras. It trades in fish, wine, and tobacco. The Arakynthos mountains lie to the northeast. The town is almost canalized but houses are within the gulf and the swamplands. The Missolonghi–Aitoliko Lagoons complex lies to the west. In the ancient times, the land was part of the gulf.

Climate
Summers are long, hot and humid, with temperatures often surpassing 40 °C and remaining above 25 °C at night. Winters are short, mild and humid with frequent rainfalls.

Transport

National Transport

The new Greek National Motorway 5 (Ionia Odos) passes north of Missolonghi.

The town had a railway station on the Hellenic Railways Organisation line from Krioneri to Agrinio but this has been abandoned since the 1970s.

The Intercity Buses Of Aitoloakarnania also have service towards Agrinio, Amfilochia, Astakos, Volos, Vonitsa, Thessaloniki, Lamia, Larisa, Livadeia, Mitikas, Patras, Chalkida and the capital Athens.

The local airport has a hard runway but no scheduled services. The closest airport with scheduled services is Aktion National Airport just an hour and half away.

Two new ferry connections towards Zakynthos, Cephalonia, and Ithaca are to be launched by the next summer season (2019 - 2020).

Education
Three departments of university of Patras based in the city.

Administration
The municipality Missolonghi was formed at the 2011 local government reform by the merger of the following 3 former municipalities, that became municipal units:
Aitoliko
Missolonghi
Oiniades

The municipal unit Missolonghi is subdivided into 8 communities:
Agios Georgios 
Agios Thomas 
Ano Koudouni 
Ellinika 
Evinochori 
Missolonghi 
Mousoura 
Retsina

The municipality has an area of 680.372 km2, the municipal unit 280.168 km2.

Province
The province of Missolonghi was one of the provinces of the Aetolia-Acarnania Prefecture. Its territory corresponded with that of the current municipality Missolonghi (except part of the municipal unit Oiniades) and the municipal units Angelokastro, Arakynthos and Makryneia. It was abolished in 2006.

History

Early history
North-west of Missolonghi are the remains of Pleuron (modern Asfakovouni), a town mentioned in Homer's works. It participated in the Trojan War and was destroyed in 234 BC by Demetrius II Aetolicus. The new town, which was built on the remains of old Pleuron, was one of the most important towns in Aetolia. Its monumental fortification comprised thirty towers and seven gates. The remains of the theatre and an enormous water tank with four compartments still exist.

The modern settlement of Missolonghi was first mentioned by a Venetian called Paruta when he was describing the naval Battle of Lepanto, which took place nearby. According to predominant historical opinion, its name came from the combination of two Italian words, mezzo and laghi which means "in the middle of lakes" or messo and laghi (Messolaghi) which means "a place surrounded by lakes". 

The town grew as a fishing and trading hub. It was captured in 1684 by the Venetians, and held throughout the Morean War, but it was returned to the Ottoman Empire after the 1699 Treaty of Karlowitz. The town joined the Orlov Revolt in 1770, but the uprising was quickly quelled and it returned to Ottoman rule.

Greek War of Independence 

When the Greek War of Independence broke out in spring 1821, Missolonghi was the first place in western Greece to join the uprising, on 20 May 1821, under the leadership of the town notables, chiefly Athanasios Razikotsikas, Panos Papaloukas, and A. Kapsalis. With rumours of Greek successes in the Morea and eastern Greece spreading throughout April, most of the Turkish families of the town had already evacuated to nearby Vrachori, where there was a strong Ottoman military presence. Missolonghi was soon reinforced by the klepht chieftain Dimitrios Makris, who immediately occupied the nearby island of Anatoliko; there too, the few Turks abandoned the town without resistance and made for Vrachori.

Its location made it a vital bastion to the Greeks in the War of Independence: protected by a chain of small islands and its lagoon from the sea, and by a wall and the marshy terrain from the landward side, it was strategically located near the Peloponnese and the Ionian Islands. Coming from Marseilles, Alexandros Mavrokordatos landed in the town in July, and made it the base of his attempts to form his own power-base in western Greece, independent of the authority of Dimitrios Ypsilantis in the Morea. On 4 November, Mavrokordatos and his political allies convened an assembly of regional representatives in the town, which established a separate governing body, the "Senate of Western Continental Greece".

Nevertheless, the city held out against the first Ottoman attempt to capture it in 1822. A 7,000-8,000 strong Ottoman army under Omer Vryonis and Mehmed Reshid Pasha laid siege to the city on 25 October 1822. The small Greek garrison of 500 men, under Mavrokordatos, managed to delay the Ottomans by pretending to negotiate a surrender until the Greek fleet landed reinforcements on 8 November. The subsequent Ottoman attacks were beaten off, and the onset of winter, disease, and the attacks of other Greek forces from the rear under Georgios Karaiskakis forced the Ottoman commanders to lift the siege on 31 December 1822. 

A second Ottoman attack, led by Vryonis and Mustafa Pasha of Scutari, was launched on 20 September 1823, and focused mostly on Anatoliko. Facing the onset of winter, disease, the failure of the simultaneous Ottoman operations in eastern Greece, and Greek attacks on their foraging parties, the Ottoman commanders abandoned the siege on 17 November.

Another siege started on 15 April 1825 by Reşid Mehmed Pasha whose army numbered 30,000 men and was later reinforced by another 10,000 men led by Ibrahim Pasha, son of Muhammad Ali Pasha of Egypt. After a year of relentless enemy attacks and facing starvation, the people of Missolonghi decided to leave the beleaguered city in the "Exodus of its Guards" (The Sortie) on the night of 10 April 1826. At the time, there were 10,500 people in Missolonghi, 3,500 of whom were armed. Very few people survived the Ottoman pincer movement after the betrayal of their plan.

Due to the heroic stance of the population and the subsequent massacre of its inhabitants by the Turkish-Egyptian forces, the town of Missolonghi received the honorary title of Hiera Polis (the Sacred City), unique among other Greek cities. The famous British poet and philhellene Lord Byron, who supported the Greek struggle for independence, died in Missolonghi in 1824. He is commemorated by a cenotaph, containing his heart, and a statue located in the town.

Modern era

The town itself is very picturesque but also modern with functional, regular urban planning. Some very interesting buildings representative of traditional architecture can be seen here. People whose names were related to modern Greek history once lived in some of them. The mansion of the Trikoupis family, Palamas' House, Valvios Library, Christos and Sophia Moschandreou Gallery of Modern Art emphasize the fact that Missolonghi has always been a city of some wealth and refinement. In addition, the Centre of Culture and Art, Diexodos, which hosts cultural events and exhibitions as well as the Museum of History and Art is housed in a neo-classical building in Markos Botsaris Square and hosts a collection of paintings indicative of the struggle of Missolonghi, further boosting the city's cultural and artistic profile. The Messolonghi Byron Society also, founded in 1991 in the city, is a non profit organisation which is devoted to promoting scholarly and general understanding of Lord Byron's life and poetry as well as cultivating appreciation for other historical figures in the 19th-century international Philhellenic movement, idealists who, like Byron, gave their fortunes, talents, and lives for the cause of Greek War of Independence. The Messolonghi Byron Center is now located in the upper floor of Byron House.

Today, the Entrance Gate remains intact and so does part of the fortification of the Free Besieged which was rebuilt by King Otto. Past the gate, there is the Garden of Heroes where several famous and some anonymous heroes who fought during the Heroic Sortie are buried. The Garden of Heroes is the equivalent of the Elysian Fields for modern Greece. Every year the Memorial Day for the Exodus is celebrated on Palm Sunday (the Sunday before Easter); the Greek State is represented by high-ranking officials and foreign countries by their ambassadors.

Media
Radiofonikos Stathmos Mesolongiou,(Radio Missolonghi 92FM),Website

Landmarks

Museum of the History and the Art of the Sacred City of Messolonghi, Website
 Centre of Culture and Art, Diexodos,Website
Christos and Sophia Mosxandreou Gallery of Modern Art
The Messolonghi Byron Society-International Research Center for Lord Byron and Philhellenism,Website

Notable people

Lord Byron died here in 1824 and is commemorated by a cenotaph and a statue
Epameinontas Deligeorgis (1829–1879), former Prime Minister of Greece
John Lykoudis (1910–1980), major and medical doctor involved in the treatment of peptic ulcer disease
Miltiadis Malakasis (1869–1943), poet
Spyros Moustaklis, Army officer, democracy activist during the junta
Thanasoulas Valtinos (1801 or 1802-1870 or 1877), revolutionary of the Greek War of Independence
Kostis Palamas (1859–1943), Greek poet, co-author of the Olympic Hymn
Anastasios Papoulas (1859–1935), Greek general and commander-in-chief in the Greco-Turkish War (1919–1922)
Antonis Travlantonis (1895–1896), Greek educator, former director of Zosimaia School
Charilaos Trikoupis (1832–1896), Prime Minister of Greece
Nikolaos Trikoupis (1869–1956), Greek general
Spyridon Trikoupis (1788–1873), Prime Minister of Greece, father of Charilaos Trikoupis
Charalambos Tseroulis (1879–1929), Greek general
Dimitrios Valvis (1814–1886), Prime Minister of Greece
Zinovios Valvis (1800–1872), Prime Minister of Greece
Sperantza Vrana (1926–2009), actress

Historical population

International relations

Twin towns—sister cities
Missolonghi is twinned with:

See also
List of settlements in Aetolia-Acarnania

References

Sources

External links

Cultural Centre Of Messolonghi 
Municipality of Messolonghi 
Information about Mrssolonghi 
News from Messolongi 
Messolonghi Travel and Business Guide 
The Acheloos delta forms the Messolongi Lagoon
Sights and Activities in Messolongi

 
Mediterranean port cities and towns in Greece
Municipalities of Western Greece
Greek prefectural capitals
Holy cities
Provinces of Greece
Populated places in Aetolia-Acarnania